Intan Azura binte Mokhtar (Jawi: اينتن ازورا بنت مختار; born 1976) is a former Singaporean politician. On 30 June 2020, Intan announced her retirement from politics to focus more on her health, her family, and her personal and professional growth in the next half of her life.

She served as the Member of Parliament (MP) for the Jalan Kayu ward in the Ang Mo Kio Group Representation Constituency (GRC) from 7 May 2011 to 23 June 2020. She is also a member of the governing People's Action Party (PAP).

Education
Intan graduated with a bachelor's degree in physics from the National University of Singapore (NUS) before moving on to complete a postgraduate diploma in education at the National Institute of Education in Nanyang Technological University (NTU). She obtained a Master of Science and Doctor of Philosophy in information studies from NTU's Wee Kim Wee School of Communication and Information. She also holds a Master of Public Administration from NUS's Lee Kuan Yew School of Public Policy.

Career 
Intan started volunteering in 2006 at Mendaki, where she assisted in a scholarships interview panel and empowerment programme for girls. Later on, she volunteered at, and sat on the board of directors of the Singapore Muslim Women's Association. She also volunteered at The Singapore Children's Society and served as an advisor in its research committee.

Intan was a council member of Majlis Ugama Islam Singapura (MUIS) from August 2010 to March 2011. She is currently an Associate Professor in the Design and Specialised Businesses cluster, and concurrently Deputy Director of the Community Leadership and Social Innovation Centre (CLASIC) at the Singapore Institute of Technology.

Political career
Intan started her political career in the Young PAP, the youth wing of the People's Action Party (PAP). She contested in the 2011 General Election as part of a six-member PAP team in Ang Mo Kio Group Representation Constituency (GRC). The team, led by the PAP's Secretary-General Lee Hsien Loong, won 69.33% of the votes. Intan then became a Member of Parliament representing Ang Mo Kio GRC.

In 2015, Intan, along with Lee and four others, contested in the General Election in Ang Mo Kio GRC and won over 78% of the votes. She is also an advisor for the Youth PAP Community Sub-Committee.

In June 2020, Intan announced her retirement from politics to focus more on her health, her family, and her personal and professional growth in the next half of her life.

Personal life
Intan is married and has three children – two boys and a girl.

References

External links

Members of the Parliament of Singapore
People's Action Party politicians
University of Singapore alumni
Academic staff of the National University of Singapore
Singaporean people of Malay descent
Singaporean Muslims
Living people
1976 births
Singaporean women in politics